The 1st Corps of Air Force and Air Defense (Serbo-Croatian: 1. korpus ratnog vazduhoplovstva i protivvazdušne odbrane/ 1. корпус ратног ваздухопловства и противваздушне одбране) was a joint unit of Yugoslav Air Force established in 1986.

History
The 1st Corps of Air Force and Air Defense was formed on February 28, 1986, by order to organize three corps of Air Force and Air Defense. It was created by reorganization of 11th Air Defense Division. The corps area of responsibility was central of Yugoslavia. It's aviation units were based at Batajnica, Tuzla, Rajlovac, Mostar, Divulje and partly Zemunik military airports.

Units of 1st Corps of Air Force and Air Defense have participated in combat operations since end of June 1991. During May 1992 most of its units located at territory of Croatia and Bosnia and Herzegovina have been dislocated to territory of Serbia and Montenegro.

By June 1992 the 1st Corps of Air Force and Air Defense has been disbanded, and its command was reorganized into command of Air Defense Corps of newly formed Air Force of Federal Republic of Yugoslavia.

The commander of corps was general Božidar Stefanović.

Assignments
Command of Yugoslav Air Force (1986-1992)

Organization

1986-1988
1st Corps of Air Force and Air Defense
210th Signal Battalion 
252nd Fighter-Bomber Aviation Squadron 
350th Reconnaissance Aviation Squadron 
1st Air Reconnaissance Regiment 
250th Air Defense Missile Regiment 
97th Aviation Brigade
204th Fighter Aviation Regiment
130th Air Base
171st Air Base
177st Air Base
399th Air Base
423th Air Base
500th Air Base

1988-1992
1st Corps of Air Force and Air Defense
210th Signal Battalion 
1st Air Reconnaissance Regiment 
250th Air Defense Missile Regiment 
97th Aviation Brigade
204th Fighter Aviation Regiment
701st Aviation Brigade (until 1990)
130th Air Base
171st Air Base
177st Air Base
399th Air Base
423th Air Base
500th Air Base

Headquarters
Banjica (1986-1992)

Commanding officers

References

Corps of Yugoslav Air Force
Military units and formations established in 1986